Janam Kundli ( Birth Chart) is a 1995 Hindi-language action-drama film,  produced by Ibrahim Khan, Hiralal N. Patel under the Uma Productions banner and directed by Tariq Shah and it stars Jeetendra, Vinod Khanna, Reena Roy, Anu Aggarwal in the pivotal roles and music composed by Anand–Milind.

Plot
Mahendra Prasad lives a very wealthy lifestyle along with his daughter, Kiran, in a palatial house. He is very religious and superstitious and consults his astrologer, Pandit Din Dayal Shastri, on all major issues. When Kiran informs him that she and wealthy Randhir Mehra are in love with each other, he consults Din Dayal, who predicts that the alliance is unsuitable. Mahendra convinces Kiran to marry wealthy Ravi Kapoor, which she does. On the day of the marriage, Randhir attempts to speak with Kiran, but is prevented, a scuffle ensues, police arrive, and Randhir ends up shooting a police inspector, as a result, he is arrested, tried in court, and sentenced to two years in jail. Kiran gives birth to a baby boy, Sunny, who grows up and falls in love with Madhu Sodhi. When they approach her father, Rajiv, to get the two married, Rajiv initially refuses but changes his mind when he sees Mahendra's photograph. Watch as events unfold as prediction upon the prediction of Din Dayal come true - and the one which everyone dreads the most - the death of Sunny at the hands of his biological father!

Cast
 Jeetendra as Ravi Kapoor
 Vinod Khanna as Randhir Mehra / Junior
 Reena Roy as Rita 
 Anu Aggarwal as Kiran
 Paresh Rawal as Wong Ching Lee /Double Role 
 Anupam Kher as Mahendra Prasad 
 Harish as Sunny
Sunil Lahiri as Ashwini Mehra
Sakshi Sivanand as Madhu Sodhi
 Satish Kaul as Rajiv Sodhi
 Anant Mahadevan as Pandit Dindayal Shastri
 Chandrashekhar Vaidya as Surinder Mehra, Randhir's father
Kanwarjit Paintal as Ravi's friend
Dinesh Hingoo as DH
 Brij Gopal as Brij Mehra

Soundtrack

External links

1990s Hindi-language films
1995 films
1990s action drama films
Indian action drama films
Films scored by Anand–Milind
1995 drama films